George F. Tibbles (June 7, 1913February 21, 1987) was a composer and screenwriter.

He and Ramez Idriss co-wrote "The Woody Woodpecker Song" for the 1948 short film, Wet Blanket Policy; the song would receive an Academy Award nomination (Academy Award for Best Original Song), and by June 30, 1948, it was third on the hit parade.  Tibbles also composed the theme music for Bringing Up Buddy and Pistols 'n' Petticoats.

Tibbles wrote the scripts for the TV series My Three Sons, as well as several for the shows Leave It to Beaver, One Day at a Time, The Betty White Show, and Life with Elizabeth.

Awards nominations

References

External links
 

1913 births
1987 deaths
20th-century American composers
20th-century American male musicians
20th-century American screenwriters
American film score composers
American male film score composers
American male television writers
male television composers